Atalaya Mountain is a mountain peak located within the Santa Fe National Forest, in northern New Mexico, United States. It is part of the Santa Fe Mountains in the Sangre de Cristo Range, a subrange of the Southern Rocky Mountains. A relevant viewscape from the city of Santa Fe, there are no higher peaks between the city and Atalaya Mountain to the east. Viewed from the city, Atalaya Mountain is framed by Sun Mountain to the right (south), Picacho Peak to the left (north), and Thompson Peak behind it. Atalaya Mountain is accessible by following the Atalaya Trail, or via the Dale Ball Trails from the direction of Picacho Peak and trail marker number 36.

Toponymic Note

Atalaya is a spanish term meaning Watchtower. Variant names include Cerro Atalaya, and Cerro de la Atalaya. In the Tewa language, Ogapogeping, and Pogeping.

References

External links
 City of Santa Fe - Trails & Maps
 Atalaya Trail #170, Santa Fe National Forest, usda.gov
 NM HOUSE MEMORIAL 88 recognizing the Contributions of Dale Ball

Mountains of Santa Fe County, New Mexico
Landforms of Santa Fe County, New Mexico
Santa Fe National Forest
Santa Fe, New Mexico